A chainsaw is a portable motorized saw.

Chainsaw may also refer to:

People
Chainsaw Al, nickname for the corporate executive Albert J. Dunlap (born 1937)
Chainsaw, female wrestler, one half of a tag-team with partner Spike called "The Heavy Metal Sisters" from the Gorgeous Ladies of Wrestling
Chainsaw, a graffiti artist better known as ORFN
Chainsaw Charlie, later stage name for professional wrestler Terry Funk (born 1944)
Chainsaw, nickname for sportscaster Cookie Randolph of radio show Dave, Shelly, and Chainsaw

Music
Chainsaw, The Prince of Karate, stage name for Courtney Pollock (born 1975) of the American band The Aquabats
Chainsaw Records, an independent record label out of Portland, Oregon, United States

Songs
"Chain Saw", a 1976 song by the Ramones from Ramones
"Chainsaw" (Skinny Puppy song), 1987
"Chainsaw" (The Band Perry song), 2014
"Chainsaw" (Nick Jonas song)", 2016

Other uses
Chainsaw, a type of serve in the sport of pickleball
Chainsaw (log file viewer), a GUI-based log file viewer
Chainsaw (punk zine), a UK punk zine published from 1977 to 1984
Chainsaw Richard, a character from the cartoon Cartoon Hangover

See also
Chainsaws in popular culture